Lama is a genus containing four South American camelids, the wild guanaco and vicuña, and the domesticated llama and alpaca. Before the Spanish conquest of the Americas, llamas and alpacas were the only domesticated ungulates of the continent. They were kept not only for their value as beasts of burden, but also for their flesh, hides, and wool.

Classification
 
Although they were often compared to sheep by early writers, their affinity to the camel was soon perceived.  They were included in the genus Camelus in the Systema Naturae of Linnaeus.  In 1800, Cuvier moved the llama, alpaca, and guanaco to the genus Lama, and the vicuña to the genus Vicugna.  Later, the alpaca was transferred to Vicugna; both were eventually returned to Lama by the American Society of Mammalogists in 2021. These camelids are, with the two species of true camels, the sole extant representatives of a distinct section of Artiodactyla (even-toed ungulates) called Tylopoda, or "hump-footed", from the peculiar bumps on the soles of their feet. This section consists of a single family, the Camelidae, the other sections of the same great division being the Suina or pigs, the Tragulina or chevrotains, and the Pecora or true ruminants, to each of which the Tylopoda have some affinity, standing in some respects in a central position between them, sharing some characters from each, but showing special modifications not found in any of the others.

Discovery of the extinct fauna of the American continent of the Paleogene and Neogene periods, starting with the 19th-century paleontologists Leidy, Cope, and Marsh, has revealed the early history of this family. Llamas were not always confined to South America; their remains are abundant in the Pleistocene deposits of the Rocky Mountains region, and in Central America; some of these extinct forms were much larger than any now living.

None of these transitional forms has been found in Old World strata; North America was the original home of the Tylopoda. Camelids invaded the Old World via Beringia, and South America via the Isthmus of Panama, as part of the Great American Interchange. The Old World forms were gradually driven southward, perhaps by changes of climate, and having become isolated, they have undergone further special modifications. Meanwhile, the New World members of the family became restricted to South America following the peopling of the Americas by Paleo-Indians and the accompanying extinction of the megafauna.

A possible variety is the hueque or chilihueque that existed in central and south-central Chile in pre-Hispanic and early colonial times. Two main hypotheses on their status among South American camelids are given: the first one suggests they are locally domesticated guanacos and the second suggests they are a variety of llamas brought from the north into south-central Chile. Chilihueques became extinct in the 16th or 17th century, being replaced by European livestock. The causes of its extinction are unknown. According to Juan Ignacio Molina, the Dutch captain Joris van Spilbergen observed the use of chilihueques by native Mapuches of Mocha Island as plough animals in 1614.

Extant species

Characteristics
These characters apply especially to llamas. Dentition of adults:-incisors 1/3 canines 1/1, premolars 2/2, molars 3/2; total 32. In the upper jaw is a compressed, sharp, pointed laniariform incisor near the hinder edge of the premaxilla, followed in the male at least by a moderate-sized, pointed, curved true canine in the anterior part of the maxilla. The isolated canine-like premolar which follows in the camels is not present. The teeth of the molar series which are in contact with each other consist of two very small premolars (the first almost rudimentary) and three broad molars, constructed generally like those of Camelus. In the lower jaw, the three incisors are long, spatulate, and procumbent; the outer ones are the smallest. Next to these is a curved, suberect canine, followed after an interval by an isolated minute and often deciduous simple conical premolar; then a contiguous series of one premolar and three molars, which differ from those of Camelus in having a small accessory column at the anterior outer edge.

The skull generally resembles that of Camelus, the relatively larger brain cavity and orbits and less developed cranial ridges being due to its smaller size. The nasal bones are shorter and broader, and are joined by the premaxilla.
Vertebrae:
 cervical 7,
 dorsal 12,
 lumbar 7,
 sacral 4,
 caudal 15 to 20.

Ears are rather long and pointed. No dorsal hump is present. Feet are narrow, the toes being more separated than in the camels, each having a distinct plantar pad. The tail is short, and the fur is long and woolly.

The llama and alpaca are only known in the domestic state, and are variable in size and color, being often white, black, or piebald. The wild guanaco and vicuña are of a nearly uniform light-brown colour, passing into white below. The vicuña and guanaco share an obvious family resemblance and may be difficult to tell apart at a distance. The vicuña is smaller and slenderer in its proportions, and has a shorter head than the guanaco.

The guanaco has an extensive geographical range, from the high lands of the Andean region of Ecuador and Peru to the open plains of Patagonia, and even the wooded islands of Tierra del Fuego. It constituted the principal food of the Patagonian Indians, and they use its skin for the material from which their long robes are made. It is about the size of a European red deer, and is an elegant animal with a long, slender, gracefully curved neck and slim legs. The vicuña ranges throughout the Western Andes.

References

Camelids
Mammal genera
Taxa named by Georges Cuvier